Fuad Kokaly is a Palestinian politician and diplomat. He was born in 1962 in Beit Sahour, in the West Bank. He was detained by Israeli forces during the crackdown on the Beit Sahour tax resistance. He was the mayor of Beit Sahour for several years, and is a member of the Interparliamentary Assembly on Orthodoxy. He also served as the head of the Fatah party in Bethlehem. He is a member of the Palestinian Legislative Council and the current ambassador of the State of Palestine to Romania.

References

Fatah members
Kakaly, Fuad
People from Beit Sahour
Living people
Members of the 2006 Palestinian Legislative Council
1962 births
Ambassadors of the State of Palestine to Romania